|}

This is a list of electoral district results for the 1927 Victorian state election.

Results by electoral district

Albert Park

Allandale

Ballarat

Barwon

Benalla

Benambra

Bendigo

Boroondara

Brighton

Brunswick

Bulla and Dalhousie 

|- style="background-color:#E9E9E9"
! colspan="6" style="text-align:left;" |After distribution of preferences

 Preferences were not distributed to completion.

Carlton

Castlemaine and Kyneton

Caulfield

Clifton Hill

Coburg

Collingwood

Dandenong

Dundas

Essendon

Evelyn

Flemington

Footscray

Geelong

Gippsland East

Gippsland North

Gippsland South

Gippsland West

Goulburn Valley

Grant

Gunbower

Hampden

Hawthorn

Heidelberg

Kara Kara and Borung

Kew

Korong and Eaglehawk

Lowan

Maryborough and Daylesford

Melbourne

Mildura

Mornington

Northcote

Nunawading

Oakleigh

Ouyen

Polwarth

Port Fairy and Glenelg

Port Melbourne

Prahran

Richmond

Rodney 

 Preferences were not distributed.

St Kilda 

 Preferences were not distributed.

Stawell and Ararat

Swan Hill

Toorak

Upper Goulburn

Upper Yarra

Walhalla

Wangaratta and Ovens

Waranga

Warrenheip and Grenville

Warrnambool 

 Two party preferred vote was estimated.

Williamstown

Wonthaggi 

 Preferences were not distributed.

See also 

 1927 Victorian state election
 Candidates of the 1927 Victorian state election
 Members of the Victorian Legislative Assembly, 1927–1929

References 

Results of Victorian state elections
1920s in Victoria (Australia)